Guillermo Arturo Ceroni Fuentes (born 30 July 1946) is a Chilean politician who served as a member of the Chamber of Deputies, representing District 40 of the Maule Region. He served as Provisional President of the Chamber of Deputies following the death of Juan Bustos.

References

1946 births
Living people
Presidents of the Chamber of Deputies of Chile
People from Linares Province
University of Chile alumni
Party for Democracy (Chile) politicians